A Violent Separation is a 2019 crime drama film directed by Kevin and Michael Goetz, written by Michael Arkof, and starring Brenton Thwaites, Alycia Debnam-Carey, Ben Robson and Claire Holt.

Plot
In a quiet Missouri town Norman, a young deputy sheriff, covers up a shooting at the hands of his older brother, Ray, but neither of the young men are prepared for what's to come, including Norman to die to the hands of Frances. As the investigation wears on, family bonds are tested as we descend into the depths of morality and loyalty and are forced to bear witness to the violent separation of flesh and blood with everyone desperately trying to do the right thing, all while doing the wrong.

Cast
 Brenton Thwaites as Norman Young, the deputy Sheriff 
 Mylo Herrington as Young Norman 
 Alycia Debnam-Carey as Frances Campbell
 Izzy Gasperz as Young Frances  
 Ben Robson as Ray Young, Norman's elder brother 
 Creasy Gates as Young Ray
 Claire Holt as Abbey Campbell, Frances' elder sister & Ray's girlfriend 
 Hadessa Huval as Young Abbey
 Francesca Eastwood as El Camino 
 Gerald McRaney as Tom Campbell, Frances' & Abbey's father
 Ted Levine as Ed Quinn, the Sheriff
 Michael Malarkey as Clinch
 Peter Michael Goetz as Riley
 Bowen Hoover as Liam
 Cotton Yancey as old Bob
 Morley Nelson as Shane
 Jason Edwards as Fred
 Lynn Ashe as Patty
 Dane Rhodes as Hank
 Silas Cooper as ER Doctor
 Donna Duplantier as Receptionist
 Dustin Arroyo as young Deputy
 Patrick Kirton as priest
 Kim Collins as 'Whispering Pig' pub owner
 William McGovern as Store Owner

Production
On 19 October 2017, Deadline announced that Brenton Thwaites and Ben Robson have been cast as the leads in the two-handed crime thriller A Violent Separation. Alycia Debnam-Carey, Claire Holt, Francesca Eastwood, Gerald McRaney and Ted Levine were also reported to join the cast.

The principal photography began in October 2017 in Louisiana. The filming wrapped on 3 November.

Reception

Frank Scheck of The Hollywood Reporter called the film "Sluggish and unconvincing". The film also got a 2 out of 5 from The Critical Movie Critics, of which, the reviewer Dan Franzen called it "blood-is-thicker-than-water melodrama".

References

External links
 

2019 films
American buddy films
2010s crime thriller films
2010s buddy films
American crime thriller films
2010s English-language films
2010s American films